Meiorganum is a genus of fungi in the family Paxillaceae. The genus contains two species, distributed in Malaysia and New Caledonia.

References

Paxillaceae
Boletales genera